Princess Reishi (1078–1144) was the empress of her nephew Emperor Toba of Japan.

She was the daughter of Emperor Shirakawa and Fujiwara no Kenshi (1057–1084). Her father abdicated in favor of her brother in 1087. In 1107, her brother Emperor Horikawa died and was succeeded by her four-year-old nephew, Emperor Toba. She was appointed to serve ceremoniously as the empress of her nephew in 1108.  

In 1130, she ordained as a Buddhist nun.

Notes

Japanese empresses
1078 births
1144 deaths
Japanese princesses
Japanese Buddhist nuns
12th-century Buddhist nuns
Daughters of emperors